The 63rd Infantry Division ("Blood and Fire") was an infantry division of the United States Army that fought in Europe during World War II. After the war it was inactivated, but later the division number and shoulder sleeve insignia were authorized for use by the 63rd Army Reserve Command (ARCOM).

The 63rd Regional Support Command is responsible for the base and administrative support of all United States Army Reserve units throughout the seven-state region of southwestern United States including California, Nevada, Arizona, New Mexico, Oklahoma, Texas and Arkansas. Although the 63rd Regional Readiness Command located in Los Alamitos, CA, was not authorized to carry the lineage of the 63rd Infantry Division, the creation of the new 63rd Regional Support Command in Moffett Field, CA, authorizes it to inherit the lineage and the bi-color red and blue background 63rd Infantry Division flag as an exception to policy. The unit was inactivated on 6 December 2009 and replaced by the 79th Sustainment Support Command, and was reactivated as a regional support command.

World War II
 Activated: 15 June 1943
 Overseas: 25 November 1944
 Campaigns: Rhineland, Ardennes-Alsace (253rd, 254th, and 255th Infantry Regiments only), Central Europe
 Days of combat: 119
 Prisoners taken: 21,542

Awards
 7 Presidential Unit Citations
 254th Infantry Regiment for Colmar, France, 22 January-6 February 1945 (WD GO Number 44, 1945)
 2nd Battalion, 254th Infantry Regiment for Jebsheim, France, 25–29 January 1945 (WD GO Number 42, 1946)
 Companies A and B and 3rd Battalion, 253rd Infantry Regiment for Kleinblittersdorf. Germany, 17–24 February 1945 (WD GO Number 45, 1946)
 Company C, 253rd Infantry Regiment for Bübingen, Germany, 3–5 March 1945 (WD GO Number 44, 1945)
 1st Battalion, 254th Infantry Regiment for Ensheim/Siegfried Line, Germany, 16–20 March 1945 (DA GO Number 14, 1997)
 3rd Battalion, 254th Infantry Regiment for Siegfried Line, Germany, 16–20 March 1945 (DA GO Number 14, 1997)
 2nd Battalion, 253rd Infantry Regiment for Buchhof and Stein, Germany, 4–12 April 1945 (DA letter, 22 March 2000, Awards Branch, DA)
 1 French Croix de Guerre with Palm – 254th Infantry Regiment
 16 Meritorious Unit Commendations
 2 Medals of Honor (First Lieutenant James E. Robinson Jr., and Staff Sergeant John R. Crews)
 9 Distinguished Service Crosses
 1 Distinguished Service Medal
 455 Silver Stars
 3 Legions of Merit
 29 Soldier's Medals
 5,313 Bronze Stars
 68 Air Medals
 4,999 Purple Heart Medals
 1 British Military Crosses
 2 British Military Medals
 2 French Legion of Honor
 15 French Croix de Guerre individual awards

Commanders
 Brigadier General/Major General Louis E. Hibbs (June 1943 – July 1945)
 Brigadier General Frederick M. Harris (August 1945 – 27 September 1945)

Gathering strength
The 63rd Infantry Division was activated on 15 June 1943, at Camp Blanding, Florida, using a cadre from the 98th Infantry Division. Shortly thereafter, the division removed to Camp Van Dorn, Mississippi to prepare for deployment to Europe. On three occasions during the next seventeen months, the division trained up fresh recruits into effective combat teams, only to have them pulled from the division and sent overseas as replacements. The first elements of the division, anxious to get in the fight, finally arrived in Europe in December 1944 and were joined by the rest of the division in January 1945.

Order of Battle

The division consisted of the following units:
 Headquarters, 63rd Infantry Division
 253rd Infantry Regiment
 254th Infantry Regiment
 255th Infantry Regiment
 Headquarters and Headquarters Battery, 63rd Infantry Division Artillery
 718th Field Artillery Battalion (155 mm)
 861st Field Artillery Battalion (105 mm)
 862nd Field Artillery Battalion (105 mm)
 863rd Field Artillery Battalion (105 mm)
 263rd Engineer Combat Battalion
 363rd Medical Battalion
 63rd Cavalry Reconnaissance Troop (Mechanized)
 Headquarters, Special Troops, 63rd Infantry Division
 Headquarters Company, 63rd Infantry Division
 763rd Ordnance Light Maintenance Company
 63rd Quartermaster Company
 563rd Signal Company
 Military Police Platoon
 Band
 63rd Counterintelligence Corps Detachment

Major attached units
70th Tank Battalion (attached 12–18 March 1945)
740th Tank Battalion (attached 17–28 March 1945)
753rd Tank Battalion (attached 31 March-28 May 1945)
692nd Tank Destroyer Battalion (attached 30–31 May 1945)
776th Tank Destroyer Battalion (attached 16–21 March 1945)
822nd Tank Destroyer Battalion (attached 21 March-28 May 1945)
436th AAA Automatic Weapons Battalion (attached 11 February-1 May 1945)

More attached and detached units are listed here:

In action

Three regiments of the 63rd Division arrived in Marseille, France, 8 December 1944, trained at Haguenau and, under the designation Task Force Harris, protected the east flank of the Seventh Army along the Rhine River. The task force fought defensively from 22 to 30 December 1944. On 30 December 44, while the 253d Inf Regt was attached to the 44th Inf Div and the 255th Inf Regt was attached to the 100th Inf Div, the 254th Inf Regt was moved to the Colmar area of France where it was attached to the 3d Inf Div which was at the time a part of the First French Army. The infantry regiments remained with their attachments until early February 1945. The rest of the division arrived at Marseilles, 14 January 1945, and moved to Willerwald on 2 February, where it was joined by the advance elements on 6 February. On 7 February, the 63rd conducted local raids and patrols, then pushed forward, crossing the Saar River on 17 February, and mopping up the enemy in the Mühlenwald (Muehlen Woods). After bitter fighting at Güdingen early in March, the division smashed at the Siegfried Line on 15th at Saarbrücken, Germany, taking Ormesheim and finally breaching the line at Sankt Ingbert and Hassel on 20 March. Hard fighting still lay ahead, but the Siegfried Line was Germany's last attempt to defend its prewar boundaries along the western front. Before resting on 23 March, the 63d took Spiesen-Elversberg, Neunkirchen and Erbach. From then until the end of the war, the 63d Division carved a path of "blood and fire" from Sarreguemines through Germany. On 28 March, the division crossed the Rhine at Lampertheim, moved to Viernheim and captured Heidelberg on 30 March. Continuing the advance, the 63rd crossed the Neckar River near Mosbach and the Jagst River The 253rd Infantry Regiment, received the majority of the German resistance during this time at the Battle of Buchhof and Stein am Kocher. Heavy resistance slowed the attack on Adelsheim, Möckmühl, and Bad Wimpfen.

The division switched to the southeast, capturing Lampoldshausen and clearing the Harthäuser Woods on 7 April. A bridgehead was secured over the Kocher River near Weißbach on 8 April, and Schwäbisch Hall fell on 17 April. Advance elements crossed the Rems River and rushed to the Danube. The Danube was crossed on 25 April, and Leipheim fell before the division was withdrawn from the line on 28 April, and assigned security duty from the Rhine to Darmstadt and Würzburg on a line to Stuttgart and Speyer. The 63d began leaving for home on 21 August 1945, and was inactivated on 27 September 1945.

From mid-February 1945 until the end of the war, the 63rd Infantry Division made a path of Blood and Fire from Sarreguemines through the Siegfried Line to Worms, Mannheim, Heidelberg, Gunzburg and ending in Landsberg Germany at the end of April 1945 when the division was pulled from the line for a much needed rest.

War crimes

On 15 April 1945, American soldiers from the 63rd Infantry Division perpetrated the Jungholzhausen massacre, when they killed between 13 and 30 Waffen-SS and Wehrmacht prisoners of war in Braunsbach.

Casualties
Total battle casualties: 4,502
Killed in action: 861
Wounded in action: 3,326
Missing in action: 98
Prisoner of war: 219

Post-war History (1945–1962) 
Headquarters, 63rd Infantry Division
 Inactivated 27 September 1945 at Camp Myles Standish, Massachusetts.
 Assigned 1 March 1952 to the Sixth Army.
 Activated 1 March 1952 at Los Angeles, California (reflagged from 13th Armored Division.
 Reorganized and redesignated 31 March 1959 as Headquarters and Headquarters Company, 63rd Infantry Division.
 Location changed 27 March 1960 to Bell, California.
 Inactivated 31 December 1965 at Bell, California.

On 1 May 1959, the division was reorganized as a Pentomic Division.  The division's three infantry regiments were inactivated and their elements reorganized into five infantry battle groups:

253rd Infantry Regiment
 Inactivated 27–29 September 1945 at Camp Patrick Henry, Virginia, and Camp Myles Standish, Massachusetts.
 Activated 1 March 1952 with headquarters at Los Angeles, California.
 Inactivated 1 May 1959 at Los Angeles, concurrently, Headquarters and Headquarters Company consolidated with Headquarters and Headquarters Company Headquarters, 3rd Battle Group, 31st Infantry.
 The Battle Group was activated 1 May 1959 with headquarters at Los Angeles, California.  Reorganized and reflagged as the 3rd Battalion, 31st Infantry on 1 October 1963.  Location of headquarters changed 16 March 1964 to Playa del Rey, California, and inactivated at Playa del Rey on 31 December 1965.
254th Infantry Regiment
 Inactivated 29 September 1946 at Camp Kilmer, New Jersey.
 Activated 1 March 1952 with headquarters at Pasadena, California.
 Inactivated 15 May 1959 at Kansas City, concurrently, Headquarters and Headquarters Company consolidated with Headquarters and Headquarters Company Headquarters, 3rd Battle Group, 30th Infantry.
 The Battle Group was activated 1 May 1959 with headquarters at Pasadena, California. Reorganized and reflagged as the 3rd Battalion, 30th Infantry on 1 April 1963, and inactivated at Pasadena on 31 December 1965.
255th Infantry Regiment
 Inactivated 29 September 1945 at Camp Kilmer, New Jersey.
 Activated 1 March 1952 with headquarters at Los Angeles, California.
 Inactivated 1 May 1959 at Los Angeles, concurrently, Headquarters and Headquarters Company consolidated with Headquarters and Headquarters Company Headquarters, 3rd Battle Group, 27th Infantry.
 The Battle Group was activated 1 May 1959 with headquarters at Los Angeles, California.  Reorganized and redesignated as the 3rd Battalion, 27th Infantry on 1 April 1963, and inactivated at Los Angeles on 31 December 1965.
 Two additional Battle Groups were also formed:
 The 3rd Battle Group, 15th Infantry was activated 1 May 1959 with headquarters in Santa Ana, California.  Reorganized and reflagged as the 3rd Battalion, 15th Infantry on 1 April 1963, and inactivated at Santa Ana 31 December 1965.
 The 3rd Battle Group, 21st Infantry was activated 1 May 1959 with headquarters at Santa Barbara, California, and inactivated there on 1 April 1963.

Under the ROAD program (1963–1965)

On 1 April 1963, the division was reorganized as a Reorganization Objective Army Division (ROAD) unit.  Three brigade headquarters were activated and the Infantry battle groups were reorganized into six battalions.  Two Armor battalions and five Field Artillery battalions were assigned to the Division.
 Headquarters, 1st Brigade was activated at Bell, California and inactivated there on 31 December 1965.
 Headquarters, 2nd Brigade was activated at Pasadena, California, and inactivated there on 31 December 1965
 The 3rd Battalion, 15th Infantry was activated on 1 April 1963 with headquarters in Santa Barbara, California, and inactivated there 31 December 1965.
 The 4th Battalion, 27th Infantry was activated 1 April 1963 with headquarters in Long Beach, California, and inactivated there 31 December 1965.
 Headquarters, 3rd Brigade was activated at Los Angeles, California, and inactivated there on 31 December 1965.
 The 3rd Battalion, 21st Infantry was activated 1 May 1959 with headquarters at Santa Barbara, California, and inactivated there on 1 April 1963.
 The 3rd Battalion, 27th Infantry was activated on 1 April 1963 in Los Angeles, and inactivated there on 31 December 1965.
 The 3rd Battalion, 30th Infantry was activated on 1 April 1963 in Pasadena, and inactivated there on 31 December 1965.
 The 3rd Battalion, 31st Infantry was activated on 1 May 1959 in Los Angeles, moved to Playa del Rey and inactivated there on 31 December 1965.
 The 5th Battalion, 40th Armor was assigned to the Division on 27 March 1963 and inactivated on 31 December 1965.
 The 7th Battalion, 40th Armor was assigned to the Division on 1 April 1963 and inactivated on 31 December 1965.
 Headquarters, 63rd Infantry Division Artillery was activated 1 May 1959 at Bell, California and inactivated 31 December 1965.
 The 5th Battalion, 11th Field Artillery was activated on 31 March 1959 at Fresno, California and inactivated 31 December 1965.
 The 5th Battalion, 19th Field Artillery was activated on 31 March 1959 at San Bernardino, California and inactivated 31 December 1965.
 The 4th Battalion, 21st Field Artillery was activated on 31 March 1959 at Bell, California and inactivated 31 December 1965.
 The 5th Battalion, 35th Field Artillery was activated on 1 May 1959 at Pasadena and inactivated 1 April 1963.
 The 3d Battalion, 77th Field Artillery was activated on 1 May 1959 at Van Nuys and inactivated 31 December 1965.
 Division Support Command
 63d Supply and Transport Battalion

The division and subordinate elements were inactivated on 31 December 1965.

Army Reserve
The 63rd Infantry Division was reactivated in February 1952 as a unit reflagged from the 13th Armored Division, and assigned to the Army Reserve, with headquarters in Los Angeles, California. The division was again inactivated in December 1965, and the colors were transferred to the 63rd Reinforcement Training Unit.

On 1 January 1968, the 63rd Army Reserve Command (ARCOM) was activated and, as an exception to policy, allowed to wear the shoulder sleeve insignia and distinctive unit insignia of the 63rd Infantry Division. The 63rd ARCOM did not, however, perpetuate the lineage and honors of the 63rd Infantry Division, as Department of the Army policy does not authorize TDA units, such as ARCOMs, to inherit the lineage and honors of TO&E units, such as divisions.

Based at Los Alamitos Armed Forces Reserve Center, the command encompassed Army Reserve units in Southern California, Arizona, and Nevada. From 1990 through 1991, over 2,500 Army Reserve soldiers from the 63rd ARCOM served on active duty in support of Operation Desert Shield and Operation Desert Storm. Twenty-two of the command's units were mobilized, with fourteen of them deploying to the Persian Gulf.

In April 1995, the 63rd ARCOM was redesignated as the 63rd Regional Support Command (later revised to Regional Readiness Command), and its geographic boundaries were realigned to coincide with those of Federal Emergency Management Agency Region IX. The 63rd maintained command and control of 14,000 soldiers and 140 units in the states of California, Arizona and Nevada, and assumed additional responsibility to support the major functional reserve commands within its area. The 63rd RRC supported both foreign and domestic active Army missions, including participation in NATO operations in Bosnia and Kosovo. Since 2001, thousands of soldiers from the 63rd RRC have served in Afghanistan and Iraq.

In September 2008, the 63rd and 90th Regional Readiness Commands combined into the 63rd which was redesignated the 63rd Regional Support Command again, with its new headquarters at Moffett Field, California. As a key component of the Army Reserve's transition to an operational force, the newly formed 63rd RSC has foregone command and control of units in favor of a greatly expanded area of responsibility. The 63rd RSC provides base support and administrative support to over 40,000 Army Reserve soldiers in the southwest United States.

Insignia
 Shoulder sleeve insignia:
 Description: On a tear-drop-shaped olive drab background 5.72 cm (2¼ in.) wide and 8.89 cm (3½ in.) long, a scarlet flame of five rays superimposed by an upright gold sword in pale, charged with a scarlet drop of blood.
 Symbolism: The design alludes to the unit's motto, "Blood and Fire" (see below).
 Background: The shoulder sleeve insignia was designed by the division's first commander, Brigadier General Louis E. Hibbs. It was originally approved for the 63d Infantry Division on 27 March 1943. It was authorized for the 63d Army Reserve Command on 22 April 1968. It was reassigned and authorized effective 16 April 1996, for the 63d Regional Support Command. The insignia was redesignated effective 16 July 2003, for the 63d Regional Readiness Command. It was redesignated effective 17 September 2008, for the 63d Regional Support Command and amended to add a symbolism.
 Distinctive unit insignia:
 Description: A silver color metal and enamel device, 3.02 cm (1 3/16 in.) in diameter, consisting of a silver chevron on a red background, bearing seven blue wavy vertical bands; in base, a black embattled area with two merlons; encircling all, a continuous silver scroll of four folds inscribed on the upper three folds, "PRIDE" "HONOR" "SERVICE" in black letters. Overall, a yellow vertical sword, the tip charged with a scarlet drop.
 Symbolism: The elements of the design reflect the history of the 63d Infantry Division. The silver chevron simulates a spearhead and is indicative of the aggressiveness displayed by the 63rd Infantry Division during the crossing of seven European rivers—the Saar, Rhine, Neckar, Jagst, Kocker, Rems, and Danube—during World War II. The rivers are represented by the seven blue wavy bands. The breaching of the Siegfried Line at Sankt Ingbert and Hassell is symbolized by the two black merlons of the embattled area, surmounted by the yellow sword with the scarlet drop taken from the shoulder sleeve insignia of the organization.
 Background: The distinctive unit insignia was originally approved for the 63d Army Reserve Command on 8 May 1970. It was reassigned and authorized effective 16 April 1996, for the 63d Regional Support Command. The insignia was redesignated for the 63d Regional Readiness Command effective 16 July 2003. It was redesignated effective 17 September 2008, for the 63d Regional Support Command.
 Motto: "Blood and Fire," inspired by a quote of British Prime Minister Winston Churchill. At the Casablanca Conference in 1943, shortly before the activation of the 63d Infantry Division, Churchill promised to make the enemy "bleed and burn in expiation of their crimes." The slogan was adopted by Brigadier General Louis E. Hibbs, the division's first commander, who designed the shoulder sleeve insignia.

See also
 289th Engineer Combat Battalion (United States)
 SS Sea Owl – 661st Tank Destroyer Battalion
 549th Engineer Light Pontoon Company
 Wesley Addy, who was an officer in the 63rd Infantry Division during World War II
 Tony Bennett, who served in the 63rd Infantry Division during World War II
 Allen M. Burdett Jr., served in the division's 255th Infantry Regiment during World War II. He would later go on to become a Lieutenant General in the army.
 Frederick Kroesen. 254th Regiment. Later USAEUR Commander

References

Notes

Sources
 The Army Almanac: A Book of Facts Concerning the Army of the United States  U.S. Government Printing Office, 1950 reproduced at the United States Army Center of Military History
 63d Regional Support Command information page 
 The Flaming Blade, vol. 27, no. 2 (May 1991)
 Camp Van Dorn Museum

External links
63rd RSC Home Page

063d Infantry Division, U.S.
Infantry Division, U.S. 063
Military units and formations established in 1943
Moffett Field
Infantry divisions of the United States Army in World War II